For music from a year in the 2020s, go to 20 | 21 | 22 | 23 | 24

This article describes trends in popular music in the 2020s.

The beginning of the decade was a difficult time for the music industry, with the COVID-19 pandemic resulting in widespread concert cancellations due to risks of mass infection.

Overview 
The COVID-19 pandemic resulted in the cancellation or postponement of numerous music-related events scheduled to take place in the early 2020s, including major tours, festivals, and television appearances. Due to the restrictions, many artists conducted virtual experiences as an alternative to live events (e.g. Dua Lipa's Studio 2054 and Taylor Swift's Folklore: The Long Pond Studio Sessions). The COVID-19 pandemic has also resorted to postponements or the rescheduling of major tours to at least a year or two from their initially scheduled tour dates, examples including The Stadium Tour (co-headlined by Mötley Crüe and Def Leppard), Ozzy Osbourne's headlining tour No More Tours II and Rage Against the Machine's reunion tour.

Trends 

In 2020, LP records surpassed Compact Disc sales for the first time since 1986, LP records 28.7% ($619.6 million) with the rapid decline in Compact Disc sales by 23% ($483 million), with 62% ($1.1 billion) of revenue derived from physical music sales across the United States according to the Recording Industry Association of America (RIAA), 2020 Year-End Music Industry Revenue Report.

The early part of the decade carried on the cross-genre trap music and footwork influence which started in the late 2010s. Thanks to the rise of social media platforms such as TikTok, music genres old and new had a moment in the spotlight. Genres such as synth-pop, nu-disco, pop-punk, emo-pop, house, indie rock, drill music, k-pop and afrobeats garnered considerable attention in the mainstream media.

British rock magazine Kerrang! wrote that Olivia Rodrigo's "Good 4 U" (2021) leads the commercial comeback of rock music in 2020–2021, noting how it is the first rock song since Evanescence's "Bring Me to Life" (2003) to spend four or more weeks atop the UK Singles chart, alongside chart success of other rock-adjacent artists, such as Willow Smith, Machine Gun Kelly, Måneskin, and Miley Cyrus. Slate proclaimed that Rodrigo "might be the dying genre's best hope", pinpointing that "Good 4 U" is the "most up-the-middle rock song to top the [U.S.] Hot 100 in a decade or more".

Media outlets and fans online observed a music trend called "Sad Girl Autumn" or "Sad Girl Fall" in early 2020s, which refers to the release of melancholic and introspective music by female artists during autumn, such as Swift's Red (Taylor's Version), Adele's 30, Clairo's Sling, Phoebe Bridgers' Punisher, and Mitski's "Laurel Hell"; it is a counterpart to "Hot Girl Summer", a catchphrase coined by American rapper Megan Thee Stallion with her 2019 song of the same name.

The pandemic-era drive for nostalgia and desire to return to the way things were has played a role in the shift, The market rapidly shifted toward old music. According to data observed throughout 2021 and 2022, 70% of music demand is for old songs and it is increasing every year. And the top 200 most popular songs were only account for 5% of total streams — and that small percentage has fallen by half over the last three years. Older musicians such as Bob Dylan, Stevie Nicks, and Bruce Springsteen were selling their music rights for hundreds of millions of dollars. These big names have always been popular, but according to some research, the vast majority of new downloads today are songs that are at least two years old. Other journalists have pointed out that the gen z demographic are more likely to listen to self-published and obscure acts due to the accessibility of the internet landscape, and even then acts such as Billie Eilish, Justin Bieber, Harry Styles, Olivia Rodrigo, Doja Cat and Lil Nas X remained popular within that demographic thanks to their major label support systems. Gen Z had a fondness for the obscure 1980s subgenre shoegaze and 1960s rock music during the pandemic.

Highlights (2020 to late-2022) 
On July 5, 2022, American music magazine Billboard published an article listing "The 25 Musical Moments That Defined the First Quarter of the 2020s" in chronological order. They are:
 Controversy regarding American music executive Deborah Dugan's position as the Recording Academy president/CEO
 Murder of American rapper Pop Smoke
 Cancellation of Austin music festival South by Southwest 2020
 Verzuz, a webcast series by American record producers Timbaland and Swizz Beatz
 Blackout Tuesday, a protest against racism and police brutality on June 2, 2020.
 Release of Folklore (2020), the eight studio album by American singer-songwriter Taylor Swift, as a surprise.
 Billboard Hot 100 number-one debut of "Dynamite", a 2020 single by South Korean pop group BTS 
 Viral video of TikTok user Doggface208, incorporating "Dreams" (1977) by British-American rock band Fleetwood Mac.
 Sale of American musician Bob Dylan's music catalog to Universal Music Group
 Billboard 200 number-one debut of El Ultimo Tour del Mundo (2020), the third studio album of Puerto Rican rapper-singer Bad Bunny
 Release of "Drivers License" (2021), the debut single of American singer-songwriter Olivia Rodrigo
 Controversy over American country singer Morgan Wallen's verbal usage of nigger, a racist anti-black slur
 Sale of American DJ 3LAU's 33 non-fungible tokens (NFTs) for around US$12 million
 Release of "Montero (Call Me by Your Name)", a 2021 single by American rapper Lil Nas X, and its music video
 A concert at Madison Square Garden by American rock band Foo Fighters after a 15-month lockdown
 Release of "WAP", the 2020 single by American rappers Cardi B and Megan Thee Stallion, and its music video
 "Blinding Lights" (2019) by Canadian singer the Weeknd becomes the longest charting song of all time on the Hot 100
 Universal Music Group becoming a public company.
 "Essence" (2020) by Nigerian singer Wizkid entering the top 10 region of the US Hot 100
 Stampede at the opening night of Astroworld Festival, a concert by American rapper Travis Scott, killing 10 attendees and injuring hundreds—the deadliest concert tragedy in nearly two decades; it resulted in around 400 lawsuits.
 Hot 100 number-one debut of Swift's 2021 song "All Too Well (10-Minute Version) (Taylor's Version) (From the Vault)"
 A Los Angeles concert in support of former gang leader Larry Hoover by Canadian musician Drake and American rapper Kanye West
 Release of Encanto, a 2021 animated musical fantasy film by Disney
 Vinyl LPs surpassing CDs in annual sales (2021) for the first time since 1991
 Unanticipated popularity and commercial resurgence of "Running Up That Hill", the 1985 single by British singer-songwriter Kate Bush, following its usage in science fiction horror television series Stranger Things
 Death of Taylor Hawkins, the drummer of Foo Fighters, in March 2022

Pop 
Taylor Swift, Justin Bieber, Olivia Rodrigo, Harry Styles, Doja Cat, the Weeknd, Billie Eilish, Dua Lipa, and Lil Nas X are some of the best-selling pop artists of the decade. Several music executives and journalists projected Adele's 30 to sell over a million albums in its opening week in the US. However, when the album fell short of the one-million mark, selling 692,000 albums, The New York Times asked "if Adele couldn't sell more than a million albums in a single week, could any artist?" In October 2022, Swift's Midnights (2022) opened with over 1.1 million pure albums, with Rolling Stone asserting that Swift "has once again moved the goalposts regarding what the music industry can see as possible from a major pop star". Pop music continued to be successful in the 2020s, propelled by albums like Midnights, Sour, After Hours, Future Nostalgia, and Renaissance, the first of which found an exemplary, ubiquitous success across all formats of music consumption "unseen" since the 1990s.

Retro pop 
The 2020s in music have provided heavily to the resurgence of musical elements brought to life in the 1970s, 1980s, 1990s, and 2000s.
 Motivated by early 1970s experimental and synth pop music, albums such as Harry Styles' Harry's House and Swift's Midnights drew influences from this era. Their respective lead singles "As It Was" and "Anti-Hero", both of which incorporated vintage synthesizers, were met with critical acclaim and instant commercial success. "As It Was" remained at number-one for 15 non-consecutive weeks on the Hot 100, becoming the longest-reigning solo song in history. Harry's House went on to win Album of the Year, as well as Best Pop Vocal Album at the 65th Annual Grammy Awards. Swift became the first artist ever to occupy the Hot 100's entire top 10 simultaneously.
 Influenced by the 1980s retro musical elements, Dua Lipa, Lizzo, and The Weeknd incorporated heavy disco, funk, and synth-pop influences in their works such as Future Nostalgia, Special, and After Hours, respectively; all albums were met with commercial and critical acclaim. Lipa's singles "Don't Start Now" and "Levitating", Lizzo's "About Damn Time", and the Weeknd's "Blinding Lights" and "Save Your Tears" were commercially successful. "Blinding Lights" went on to become the biggest Billboard Hot 100 song of all time, spending 90 weeks on the chart—the most for any song. Future Nostalgia won Best Pop Vocal Album at the 63rd Annual Grammy Awards. "About Damn Time" went on to win Record of the Year at the 65th Annual Grammy Awards.
 Miley Cyrus' 2020 album Plastic Hearts was credited as a front-runner to the resurgence of pop-rock music, especially that of the 1970s-1980s. Critics claimed her transition from pop music to rock brought forth a nostalgic feel, one that will seemingly become a trend this decade. Her eighth studio album, Endless Summer Vacation, was preceded by the single, "Flowers", which was met with instant commercial success, becoming the fastest song to reach 100 million streams on Spotify—within a week.
 Kate Bush's song "Running Up That Hill", which was actually released in the 1980s, gained a massive following after having a pivotal role in the fourth season of Stranger Things. Metallica's 1986 single "Master of Puppets" also saw a revival because of its inclusion in the show.
 Lady Gaga's Chromatica and Beyoncé's Renaissance sought to recreate 1990s dance and house music styles. Gaga's "Rain On Me" and Beyonce's "Break My Soul" reached the top spot on the Hot 100 chart. Renaissance won Best Dance/Electronic Album at the 65th Annual Grammy Awards, which ultimately named Beyoncé as the recipient of the most Grammy Awards of all time. Ariana Grande's Positions used heavy 1990s R&B and pop elements, crediting samples from popular artists from that decade, such as Aaliyah.
 With its nostalgic presence for younger audiences, sounds from the early 2000s resurge into today's music with elements of indie rock, post-punk, and post-grunge.

Bedroom pop 
Beginning in the late 2010s, the term “bedroom pop” gained greater exposure, and was frequently used to describe home-recorded DIY music that often featured downtempo, soft, and lo-fi characteristics. Songs dubbed “bedroom pop” often contained elements of vulnerability, honesty, and relatability to younger audiences. This new era of sounds brought many artists into the spotlight. Musicians such as Clairo, Cuco, Beabadoobee, Hemlocke Springs, Conan Gray and Girl In Red  became popular through their social media presence. Songs such as Clairo's "Sofia", Beabadoobee's "Coffee", Springs' "Girlfriend" and Gray's "Heather" were commercially successful due to the prominence of TikTok, where all of the previously listed songs went viral. The use of TikTok has helped many bedroom pop artists rise to fame due to its easy-access and widespread audio listening availability. Some of these musicians writing music about lesbian relationships led to the term sapphic pop being coined.

Latin pop 

Latin pop and other Latin music genres such as reggaeton continue to be successful in the 2020s. Selena Gomez released her first Spanish-language project, Revelación, in March 2021. It incorporated urbano influences. Anitta's Envolver song became the first song by a Latin female act to reach the number one on Spotify Global Daily chart, reaching the number two on the Billboard Global 200 and the number one in Billboard Global Excl. U.S. The soundtrack of Encanto, Disney's 2021 animated fantasy film, written and produced by American playwright Lin-Manuel Miranda, was a viral phenomenon, enjoying widespread popularity on the internet. It has spent multiple weeks atop the Billboard 200 chart. Far Out called the phenomenon "Encanto-mania". The TikTok videos tagged with the hashtag "#encanto" have received more than 11.5 billion views in total, as of January 23, 2022. The most popular song of the soundtrack was "We Don't Talk About Bruno", a salsa tune which experienced widespread commercial success in 2022. "Dos Oruguitas" was nominated for the Academy Award for Best Original Song at the 94th Academy Awards. On September 29, 2022, Aguilera performed "La Reina" at the 2022 Billboard Latin Music Awards and received the Billboard Spirit of Hope Award. La Luz, the third and final EP from Christina Aguilera, was released that same day and featured a spoken intro by Aguilera and "No Es Que Te Extrañe".

K-pop 

The 2020s have featured some heavily successful group debuts. In November 2020, BTS became the first Korean pop artist to be recognized by the Recording Academy when "Dynamite" received a nomination for Best Pop Duo/Group Performance at the 63rd Annual Grammy Awards; they were again nominated the following year with "Butter". On April 16, 2022, at Coachella, 2NE1 reunited after 6 years with a surprise performance on the main stage. Aespa also performed on the festival's main stage the following weekend. Blackpink's 2022 album Born Pink became the first album by a female group to top the chart since Danity Kane's Welcome to the Dollhouse in 2008. In addition, it marked the first time a girl group simultaneously topped the album charts in the United States and United Kingdom in 21 years, since Destiny's Child's Survivor in 2001.

Pop punk 
This decade has provided music with a clear resurgence of 2000's alt-pop and pop-punk.
 Olivia Rodrigo and Billie Eilish are considered the front-runners in re-introducing the pop-punk genre to younger generations. Their inclusion of angsty pop hits, as well as acoustic power ballads has proven reminiscant of soft grunge albums found popular in the late 1990's and early 2000's. Released to instant critical and commercial acclaim, their respective albums, Sour and Happier Than Ever each spent multiple weeks atop the Billboard 200 chart. Rodrigo's singles "Drivers License" and "Good 4 U" and Eilish's "Therefore I Am" and "Happier Than Ever" became commercially successful. Rodrigo went on to win Best Pop Solo Performance for "Drivers License", and Best Pop Vocal Album for Sour at the 64th Annual Grammy Awards. The momentum she received the year prior also awarded her with Best New Artist at the ceremony. Eilish won the same award at the 62nd Annual Grammy Awards, following the success of her debut album, When We All Fall Asleep, Where Do We Go?.
 Paramore released their first album in six years, This Is Why, to commercial acclaim, with the album debuting at number two on the Billboard 200 chart. The band is considered to have brought pop-punk back into the mainstream, a genre in which they were a major part of in the late 2000s.
 Artists such as Machine Gun Kelly, Willow Smith, Maggie Lindemann, Meet Me @ the Altar, Kenny Hoopla, Origami Angel, Waterparks, Magnolia Park and Travis Barker released tracks that achieved general praise from the public. Tickets to My Downfall by Machine Gun Kelly reached number one on the Billboard 200 chart in 2020. Willow Smith collaborated with Travis Barker from Blink-182 on the song "Transparent Soul" which reached the top 10 on the rock charts. Avril Lavigne also returned to the genre in collaborations with Barker and Mod Sun. The Chaos Chapter: Freeze and the repackage Fight or Escape by the Korean boyband Tomorrow X Together brought pop punk and emocore references, mainly on their lead singles "0X1=Lovesong (I Know I Love You)" and "Loser=Lover".
 In another crossover phenomenon of the early 2020s several established rap artists released pop punk material, including Machine Gun Kelly, The Kid Laroi, Blackbear and Mod Sun.
 The 2020s also marked the reunion of My Chemical Romance; in addition to their reunion tour, they released their new single The Foundations Of Decay. The bands Panic! At The Disco and Fall Out Boy also made comebacks with the former's album Viva Las Vengeance and the latter is expected to release their album So Much (For) Stardust after going on the Hella Mega Tour with Green Day and Weezer. Veteran punk bands Blink-182 and Simple Plan have also released their new music.

Hyperpop 
Some of the efforts from hyperpop artists such as Charli XCX,  Dorian Electra, Slayyter, A.G Cook, Midwxst, Ericdoa, Glaive, Ecco2k, Quinn, That Kid, Bladee and 100 Gecs received critical appraisal. Charli XCX's How I'm Feeling Now, due to its themes of self-reflection and social isolation, connected with listeners during the COVID-19 pandemic. XCX's fifth studio album, Crash, became her most successful album commercially and critically, peaking in the top 10 of the Billboard 200, and marking her first number-one on the UK Albums Chart. Scottish musician Sophie, who revolutionized avant pop and experimental pop genres, and represented transgender people in the electronic music scene, died on January 31, 2021.

Hip hop and R&B

Rap 

Late in the 2010s, a generation of artists emerged with party rap music that emphasizes feminism and queer empowerment. Artists such as Lizzo, Megan Thee Stalion, SZA, City Girls, Saucy Santana, Flo Mili, Lil Nas X, Doja Cat and Rico Nasty became prominent hip hop artists. Female rappers achieved widespread popularity and helped create the market for women in the predominantly male mainstream hip-hop genre thanks to their openly sexual lyrics and danceable instrumentation. Megan Thee Stallion had two number one hits in the early half of the decade, including her collaboration with Cardi B titled "WAP", and her hit single "Savage".

Doja Cat quickly became one of the best-selling artists of the decade, despite her breakthrough being in 2020. Her first #1 single, "Say So", aided this process, as it brought the public's attention to her work. In early 2021, Doja released the lead single "Kiss Me More" to her third studio album, Planet Her. The song received instant acclaim, peaking at #3 on the Billboard Hot 100. After the release of Planet Her, Doja secured two more top-ten hits, with "Need To Know" and "Woman", peaking at #8 and #7, respectively. Planet Her became one of the best-selling albums of the decade, spending 26 weeks in the top 10 of the Billboard 200 chart.

Rage Rap and other unique sounds have been introduced throughout this decade by artists like Yeat, Playboi Carti and others, who are influencing artists and redefining rap in various ways. Rappers in this genre, such as YEAT, have dominated the rap scene and have achieved numerous Billboard Hot 100 places and put a major spotlight on unique sounds in rap. 

Artists such as JPEGMafia, Clipping, Run the Jewels, Moor Mother, Jungle Pussy and Genesis Owusu dominated the industrial hip hop scene in the early 2020s. On November 23, 2020, Visions of Bodies Being Burned is the fourth studio album by American hip hop group Clipping. It was released on October 23, 2020, through Sub Pop and received positive reviews from music critics.

R&B 
American singer Steve Lacy earned his first number-one song on the Billboard Hot 100 with "Bad Habit". In December 2022, SZA released her second studio album, SOS, which became her first number-one on the Billboard 200, and spent ten weeks atop the chart—the most weeks of any female artist since 2016, with Adele's 25. All of its 23 tracks charted on the Hot 100, becoming the second artist after Swift to chart 20 songs in a single week. One of its singles, "Kill Bill", was a commercial success, peaking at number two on the Hot 100 chart.

Reggaeton 
The late 2010's saw a major cultural resurgence in Latin dance music with hip hop influences which carried throughout the 2020's. Artists such as Bad Bunny, Chencho Corleone, Ozuna, Karol G and Rauw Alejandro saw crossover success in the United States while remaining popular internationally.

Drift phonk 
In 2020, TikTok popularized the hip hop style drift phonk—a genre that was generally explored by music producers in Russia. In May 2021, following the rise in popularity of the genre in Russia, Spotify released an official curated phonk playlist.

Folk and indie 

Social media algorithms fed the popularity of indie artists, from established acts Steve Lacy, Beach Bunny, Phoebe Bridgers, Joji, Hemlocke Springs and Mitski to lesser known artists like Black Country, New Road and Black Midi.

Influenced by the COVID-19 pandemic, many artists created unplugged, "stripped-down" music mainly driven by acoustic or classical music instruments and melancholic subject matter. Taylor Swift shifted from mainstream pop to adopt indie folk, alternative rock and chamber pop styles. She released two of the best selling albums of 2020, Folklore and Evermore. Both debuted at number one on the Billboard 200 chart, with their respective lead singles, "Cardigan" and "Willow" doing the same on the Hot 100 chart. Folklore spent a record eight weeks atop the Billboard 200, and won the Album of the Year at the 63rd Annual Grammy Awards. Journalists contextualized both the albums as "pandemic projects", timely for the period's struggles and introspective, escapist thoughts.

Lana Del Rey released two folk-inspired studio albums in 2021: Chemtrails over the Country Club and Blue Banisters. Other notable folk and indie records released include Clairo's Sling, Phoebe Bridgers' Punisher, Japanese Breakfast's Jubilee, and Arlo Parks' Collapsed In Sunbeams. All released to critical acclaim, albums in this genre tend to resemble bedroom pop, but usually contain more mature subject material. The latter three were all nominated for Best Alternative Music Album at their respective Grammy Awards.

Lorde ventured into psychedelic folk-pop in her third studio album, Solar Power, an apparent contrast to her previous album Melodrama. This transition from dance pop and electropop into indie and folk-pop has garnered the term "solar powerification", as many other artists have also made this shift. A prominent example includes Carly Rae Jepsen, with her changeover from her disco-infused albums Dedicated and Dedicated Side B into her stripped back, synth-based record The Loneliest Time.

Glass Animals' breakout song "Heat Waves" stayed number one on the Billboard Alternative Charts for seven weeks in 2021, making it one of the most successful singles of the year. English singer-songwriter PinkPantheress released her debut mixtape To Hell with It, which received widespread acclaim in reviews from music critics upon release. To Hell with It was named the third best album of 2021 by Time and the fifth best album of the year by The New York Timess Jon Caramanica and Gigwise. Joji's "Glimpse of Us" peaked at No. 8 on the Billboard Hot 100 songs chart upon its release, marking the singer-first songwriter's visit to the region. The song, which was released on June 10, 2022, received almost immediate acclaim, rocketing up the Official Singles Chart and also debuting straight inside the Top 10 of the US Billboard Hot 100.

Country 
Dangerous: The Double Album by American country singer Morgan Wallen became the first country album to spend its first four weeks atop the Billboard 200 chart since Shania Twain's Up! did so in January 2003. Having finished third on American Idol, country artist Gabby Barrett released her debut single "I Hope" in 2019. It reached number one on the Billboard Country Airplay chart dated April 25, 2020, and eventually topped the Hot Country Songs chart dated July 25, 2020, making it the first debut single by a female artist to top the latter since 2006.

Swift's re-recordings, Fearless (Taylor's Version) and Red (Taylor's Version), were the top two best-selling country albums of 2021. Her decision to re-record her masters sparked worldwide interest, making Swift the first artist to have a re-recorded album reach number one on the Billboard 200, with Fearless (Taylor's Version). Her second re-recorded album, Red (Taylor's Version) also debuted at number one. The latter included "All Too Well (Taylor's Version)", a non-single at just over ten minutes, that became the longest song in history to chart at number one on the Billboard Hot 100.

Kacey Musgraves' fourth studio album Star-Crossed received attention for its inclusion of disco and dance-pop, but sparked a genre categorization controversy with the Grammy Awards. After her submission to the Recording Academy in the country categories, her album was seemingly left out from any nominations, despite its positive reviews in contrast to other country albums released during the eligibility period. The Academy stated that her record failed to include enough country material to be considered for country categories at the award ceremony. Musgraves questioned their judgment, after her previous album, Golden Hour included just as much influence from pop music, yet was nominated for, and won all awards that year, including Best Country Album, and Album Of The Year.

Rock 
The genres hard rock and heavy metal had declined in mainstream popularity by the early 2020s. However, Italian hard rock band Måneskin rose to worldwide prominence following the band's win at the Eurovision Song Contest 2021 with their song "Zitti e buoni". Måneskin's cover of the song The Four Seasons' "Beggin'" reached the top 10 on the Billboard Global Excl. U.S. and was ranked 66th in Billboard Year End Hot 100 chart of 2021. Several veteran acts have continued to maintain popularity worldwide, including AC/DC, whose 2020 album Power Up reached number one on the charts in various countries (including the United States and their homeland Australia), while Iron Maiden earned their first Top 5 album on the Billboard 200 chart, Senjutsu, for the first time in its 41-year recording career. Other veteran heavy metal acts, including Testament and Dream Theater, debuted on the Top 100 on the Billboard 200 chart with their respective albums Titans of Creation and A View from the Top of the World.

Soft rock is showcased through albums like Haim's Women In Music Pt. III, released to critical acclaim, the album amassed a nomination for Album Of The Year at the 63rd Annual Grammy Awards, making them the first all-female band to be nominated for this award. Their single "The Steps" also received a nomination for Best Rock Performance.

References 

2020s in music
2020s decade overviews